Kevin Gourdon (born 23 January 1990) is a former French rugby union player. He played as a flanker for French Top 14 side La Rochelle and the France national team.

International career
Gourdon made his debut for France in June 2016 and was part of the squad for the 2017 Six Nations Championship.

References

External links
France profile at FFR
La Rochelle profile
ESPN Profile

1990 births
Living people
French rugby union players
Stade Rochelais players
France international rugby union players
Rugby union flankers
Sportspeople from Valence, Drôme